Xixiaokou station is a station on Line 8 of the Beijing Subway.

Station Layout 
The station has an underground island platform.

Exits 
There are 4 exits, lettered A, B, C, and D. Exit A is accessible.

References

External links 

Beijing Subway stations in Haidian District